Arvi Einar Malmivaara (23 May 1885 – 30 August 1970; surname until 1906 Malmberg) was a Finnish Lutheran clergyman and politician. He was a member of the Parliament of Finland from 1935 to 1939, representing the Patriotic People's Movement (IKL). He was also active in the Lapua Movement.

He was born in Kiuruvesi, and obtained the degree of Philosophiae Magister in 1910. He was working as a teacher of a theological discipline and of drawing at Lapua's school of social sciences during 1909–1919. From 1913 to 1918 he was also a leader of this school. He worked as a parish priest in Kuusankoski in 1919–1923, and from 1923 to 1928, and then was a parish priest in Ylistaro during the period of 1928–1958.  From 1939 to 1958 he worked in Provincial Council of Lapua.

He participated in Presidential elections in Finland in 1937, 1940, 1943. From 2 September 1935 to 31 August 1939 he was a member of the Finnish Parliament from Patriotic People's Movement (IKL) in Vaasa.
Malmivaara ornamented the inner sanctuary of church in Valkeala Jesus in Gethsemane.

Personal life
He was the son of Wilhelmi Malmivaara, a member of Parliament, and Karin Rajander. He was married to Ruusa Emilia Sarparanta during 1909-1936 and later from 1937 to Agnes Charlotta Isaksson. He died in Seinäjoki.

References

1885 births
1970 deaths
People from Kiuruvesi
People from Kuopio Province (Grand Duchy of Finland)
20th-century Finnish Lutheran clergy
Patriotic People's Movement (Finland) politicians
Members of the Parliament of Finland (1933–36)
Members of the Parliament of Finland (1936–39)
University of Helsinki alumni
Finnish fascists